Paul Bowman teaches Cultural Studies at Cardiff University. He is author of Post-Marxism Versus Cultural Studies (Edinburgh University Press, 2007), Deconstructing Popular Culture (Palgrave, 2008) and Theorizing Bruce Lee (Rodopi, 2009), editor of Interrogating Cultural Studies (Pluto, 2003), The Truth of Žižek (Continuum, 2007), Reading Ranciere (Continuum 2010) and The Rey Chow Reader (Columbia University Press, 2010).

Notes and references

Living people
Academics of Cardiff University
Year of birth missing (living people)